Forte de São Diogo is a fort located in Salvador, Bahia Brazil.

See also
Military history of Brazil

References

External links

Sao Diogo
Buildings and structures in Salvador, Bahia
Portuguese colonial architecture in Brazil
National heritage sites of Bahia